Rafikov is a masculine surname, its feminine counterpart is Rafikova. It may refer to
Alimzhon Rafikov (born 1962), Tajikistani football player 
Mars Rafikov (1933–2000), Soviet cosmonaut
Rushan Rafikov (born 1995), Russian ice hockey player
Vyacheslav Rafikov (born 1986), Russian football player